Allameh Jafari Expressway is an expressway in western Tehran. It connects the western end of Hakim Expressway to Azadi Stadium.

Expressways in Tehran
Expressways in Iran